Mimosa Martini (12 March 1961 in Rome) is an Italian journalist, anchorwoman, and writer. She is best known for his work as a war correspondent and anchorwoman for RAI and Mediaset broadcasting company.

Life and career
Martini began his career in the 1980s working with Gianni Bisiach on Rai Radio 1, and then with Sandro Curzi at Tg3. During this time she covered, among other topics, politics in the Soviet Union, the Nagorno-Karabakh conflict and the Gulf War. She worked for RAI public broadcasting service for ten years and collaborated with various newspapers.

With Enrico Mentana, in 1991 Martini was one of the founder members of TG5, working as a service chief and special foreign correspondent. In the following years, she became one of the most popular anchorwomen in Italy. For thirty years, Martini covered international politics and news, working in Mediaset up until 2021. As a war correspondent, she also worked in Afghanistan, Iraq and Iran. In 2003 she hosted with Maurizio Costanzo on Canale 5 the tv show Raccontando.

In 2003, the President of Italy Carlo Azeglio Ciampi appointed Martini a Knight of the Order of Merit of the Italian Republic.

In 2004 she published the novel Kashmir palace and in 2008 the essay Il volo del cuculo with Luana De Vita, both published by Nutrimenti.

Mimosa teaches at the Master in Journalism and Radio and Television Journalism by Eidos.

Books
Mimosa Martini, Kashmir palace, Nutrimenti, 2004, ISBN 9788888389202.
Mimosa Martini and Luana De Vita, Il volo del cuculo, Nutrimenti, 2008, ISBN 9788888389912.

Honours
  Knight: Cavaliere Ordine al Merito della Repubblica Italiana: 2003

References

1961 births
Living people
Italian journalists
Italian writers
Italian war correspondents
War correspondents of the Iraq War